Joseph De Stefani (October 3, 1879 – October 26, 1940) was an American character actor of the early sound era.  Born in Venice, Italy, he began his film career in the 1931 movie, Beau Ideal. He appeared in 25 films over the next decade, his final appearance would be in a small role in 1940's A Dispatch from Reuters, which stars Edward G. Robinson. 

De Stefani was married to light-opera prima donna Helen Keers until her death in 1938. De Stefani died on October 26, 1940, exactly one week after the release of A Dispatch from Reuters.  He is buried in Forest Lawn Memorial Park in Glendale, California.

Filmography
(as per AFI's database)

References

External links
 
 

1879 births
1940 deaths
Actors from Venice
American male film actors
20th-century American male actors
Italian emigrants to the United States